The Ambassador from Israel to Luxembourg is Israel's foremost diplomatic representative in Luxembourg.

List of ambassadors
 Emmanuel Nahshon, 2019 - 
Simona Frankel (Non-Resident, Brussels) 2015 - 2019
Tamar Sam-Ash (Non-Resident, Brussels) 2007 - 2011
Yitzhak Minerbi (Non-Resident, Brussels) 1978 - 1983 
Eliashiv Ben-Horin (Non-Resident, Brussels) 1974 - 1978
Moshe Alon (Non-Resident, Brussels) 1969 - 1974
Ambassador Amiel E. Najar (Non-Resident, Brussels) 1960 - 1968
Minister Joseph Ariel (Non-Resident, Brussels) 1952 - 1957
Minister Michael Amir 1950 - 1954

References

Luxembourg
Israel